These are the lists of Hispanic Academy Award winners and nominees by country. Each list details the performances of Hispanic filmmakers, actors, actresses and films that have either been submitted, nominated or have won an Academy Award. These lists are current as of the 91st Academy Awards ceremony held on February 24, 2019.

 List of Argentine Academy Award winners and nominees
 List of Chilean Academy Award winners and nominees
 List of Colombian Academy Award winners and nominees
 List of Cuban Academy Award winners and nominees
 List of Hispanic-American (U.S.) Academy Award winners and nominees
 List of Mexican Academy Award winners and nominees
 List of Puerto Rican Academy Award winners and nominees
  List of Spanish Academy Award winners and nominees
 List of Uruguayan Academy Award winners and nominees

Lists of Academy Award winners by ethnicity
Latin American cinema
Lists of awards lists